Allen John A. Bowers (born 27 October 1902) was a rugby union player who represented Australia.

Bowers, a wing, was born in Darlinghurst, New South Wales and claimed a total of 7 international rugby caps for Australia.

References

Australian rugby union players
Australia international rugby union players
1902 births
Year of death missing
Rugby union players from Sydney
Rugby union wings